Marc Snir is an Israeli American computer scientist. He holds a Michael Faiman and Saburo Muroga Professorship in the Department of Computer Science at the University of Illinois at Urbana-Champaign. He currently pursues research in parallel computing. He was principal investigator (PI) for the software of the petascale Blue Waters system and co-director of the Intel and Microsoft funded Universal Parallel Computing Research Center (UPCRC).

From 2007 to 2008 he was director of the Illinois Informatics Institute. He was Director of the Mathematics and Computer Science Division at Argonne National Laboratory from 2011 to 2016, and head of the Computer Science Department at Illinois from 2001 to 2007. Until 2001, he was a senior manager at the IBM T.J. Watson Research Center where he led the Scalable Parallel Systems research group that was responsible for major contributions to the IBM Scalable POWERparallel and to the Blue Gene supercomputers. He was awarded the Seymour Cray Computer Engineering Award by the Institute of Electrical and Electronics Engineers in 2013 for his "contributions to the research, development, theory, and standardization of high-performance parallel computing including the IBM RS/6000 SP and Blue Gene systems."

Snir received a Ph.D. in mathematics from the Hebrew University of Jerusalem in 1979, worked at NYU on the NYU Ultracomputer project in 1980–1982, and worked at the Hebrew University of Jerusalem in 1982–1986, before joining IBM. Marc Snir was a major contributor to the design of the Message Passing Interface. He has published numerous papers and given many presentations on computational complexity, parallel algorithms, parallel architectures, interconnection networks, parallel languages and libraries and parallel programming environments.

Snir is AAAS Fellow, ACM Fellow, and IEEE Fellow. He is on the Computing Research Association Board of Directors and is on the NSF CISE advisory committee.

Current Research Affiliations
 Universal Parallel Computing Research Center (UPCRC) at Illinois
 Blue Waters Project at the National Center for Supercomputing Applications (NCSA)
 Illinois Informatics Institute
 Information Trust Institute

See also
 Biography
 Parallel Computing Research at Illinois: The UPCRC Agenda
 Parallel@Illinois
 Illinois Department of Computer Science
 Marc Snir Discusses the Blue Waters Project with NCSA's Access Magazine
 PatHPC: Workshop on Patterns in High Performance Computing

References

University of Illinois Urbana-Champaign faculty
Fellows of the American Association for the Advancement of Science
Fellows of the Association for Computing Machinery
Fellow Members of the IEEE
IBM employees
Living people
Year of birth missing (living people)
Israeli computer scientists